Dutch gymnast Hendricus Thijsen competed at the inaugural World Championships in 1903.  While there he co-won gold on the pommel horse.  At the 1905 World Championships the Dutch men won the silver medal in the team competition.  It would be another 96 years before another gymnast won a medal at the World Artistic Gymnastics Championships, with Renske Endel earning a silver medal in 2001.

Medalists

References 

World Artistic Gymnastics Championships
Gymnastics in the Netherlands